Devario strigillifer is a species of danio endemic to Myanmar where it is found in shallow, fast-running streams the area of Myitkyina District.  This species grows to a length of  SL.

References
 

Devario
Fish described in 1924